Rocketown' is a  facility with entertainment space, a coffee bar, and indoor skate park, located in Nashville, Tennessee.  First opening in Franklin, TN in 1994-95 by Christian artist Michael W. Smith, Rocketown was created as a safe, drug and alcohol free place for teenagers to hang out. After closing its building for a brief period, it re-opened in 2003 in downtown Nashville. 

Rocketown features after-school classes, skateboarding, video games, and concerts. The concerts are open to patrons of all ages. Its focus is to be a safe all-ages venue that also provides after-school activities such as recording, film editing, art, dance, and much more.

The progressive metal group, Between the Buried and Me, filmed their live CD and DVD, Colors'', at Rocketown, on August 2, 2008. The Christian metal band Demon Hunter also filmed a live show at Rocketown for their live DVD and CD.

Rocketown moved a few blocks to a new location in mid-2010. The city began construction for the new Music City Center and expanded Korean Veterans Boulevard, so the venue relocated. The last show at the old location (401 6th Ave S), Travisfest, was held on Saturday April 24. The first show in the new building, Clash of the Genres, was on April 30. The now current main building was open on August 6, 2010 as a part of the Back to School Bash and Grand Opening weekend.

References

External links
 

Music venues in Tennessee
Skateparks in the United States
Coffeehouses and cafés in the United States
Culture of Nashville, Tennessee
Economy of Nashville, Tennessee
Buildings and structures in Nashville, Tennessee
Tourist attractions in Nashville, Tennessee
1994 establishments in Tennessee
Event venues established in 1994